Bac de Roda is a station on line 2 of the Barcelona Metro.

The side-platform station has an access at either end. The Carrer Bac de Roda access, unusually, has separate turnstiles for each platform. The Carrer Fluvià access has an elevator for wheelchair accessibility.

The station was opened in 1997.

Services

References

External links
 
 Bac de Roda at Trenscat.com

Railway stations in Spain opened in 1997
Barcelona Metro line 2 stations
Transport in Sant Martí (district)